Nuala Ní Dhomhnaill (born 1952) is a leading Irish poet.

Biography
Born in Lancashire, England, of Irish parents, she moved to Ireland at the age of 5 and was brought up in the Dingle Gaeltacht and in Nenagh, County Tipperary. Her uncle, Monsignor Pádraig Ó Fiannachta of Dingle, was a leading authority on Munster Irish. Her mother brought her up to speak English, though she was an Irish speaker herself. Her father and his side of the family spoke very fluent Irish and used it every day, but her mother thought it would make life easier for Nuala if she spoke English instead.

She studied English and Irish at UCC in 1969 and became part of the 'Innti' group of poets. In 1973, she married Turkish geologist Doğan Leflef and lived abroad in Turkey and Holland for seven years. 
One year after her return to County Kerry in 1980, she published her first collection of poetry in Irish, An Dealg Droighin (1981); She later became a member of Aosdána. Ní Dhomhnaill has published extensively and her works include poetry collections, children's plays, screenplays, anthologies, articles, reviews and essays. Her other works include Féar Suaithinseach (1984);  Feis (1991), and Cead Aighnis (1998). Ni Dhomhnaill's poems appear in English translation in the dual-language editions Rogha Dánta/Selected Poems (1986, 1988, 1990); The Astrakhan Cloak (1992), Pharaoh's Daughter (1990), The Water Horse (2007), and The Fifty Minute Mermaid (2007). Selected Essays appeared in 2005.

Dedicated to the Irish language, she writes poetry exclusively in Irish and is quoted as saying ‘Irish is a language of beauty, historical significance, ancient roots and an immense propensity for poetic expression through its everyday use’. Ní Dhomhnaill also speaks English, Turkish, French, German and Dutch fluently.

Ní Dhomhnaill's writings focus on the rich traditions and heritage of Ireland and draw upon themes of ancient Irish folklore and mythology combined with contemporary themes of femininity, sexuality and culture. Her myth poems express an alternative reality and she speaks of her reasons for writing about myths as those that are an integral part of the Irish language and Irish culture. ‘Myth is a basic, fundamental structuring of our reality, a narrative that we place on the chaos of sensation to make sense of our lives’.

Personal life
Ní Dhomhnaill's husband died in 2013. She currently lives near Dublin with two of her children and is a regular broadcaster on Irish radio and television.

Awards and honours
Ní Dhomhnaill has received many scholarships, prizes, and bursaries. She has also won numerous international awards for works which have been translated into French, German, Polish, Italian, Norwegian, Estonian, Japanese and English. She is one of Ireland's most well-known Irish language writers.  She was Ireland Professor of Poetry from 2001 to 2004, and the first Professor of Irish (language) Poetry.  Her papers are collected at Boston College's Burns Library. In March 2018, she received the Zbigniew Herbert International Literary Award for her achievements in poetry.

Publications

Poetry: main collections

 An Dealg Droighin (Cló Mercier, 1981)
 Féar Suaithinseach (Maigh Nuad, 1984)
 Feis (Maigh Nuad, 1991)
 Pharaoh's Daughter (1990)
 The Astrakhan Cloak (1992, Translated by Paul Muldoon)
 Spíonáin is Róiseanna (Cló Iar-Chonnachta, 1993)
 Cead Aighnis (An Sagart, An Daingean, 1998)
 The Water Horse: Poems in Irish (Gallery, 1999, Aistriúcháin le Medbh McGuckian agus Eiléan Ní Chuilleanáin)
 Northern Lights (Gallery Press, 2018)

Poetry: selected editions

 Rogha Dánta/Selected Poems (Raven Arts, 1986, Translated by Michael Hartnett)

Essay Collections 

 Selected Essays (New Island, 2005)
 Cead Isteach / Entry Permitted (University College Dublin Press, 2017)

Plays

 Jimín (Children's drama, Dublin, 1985)

References

Bibliography 
 
 

1952 births
20th-century Irish-language poets
20th-century Irish people
Alumni of University College Cork
Aosdána members
Irish women poets
Living people
People from Dingle
Writers from Lancashire